Sir James Haughton, CBE, QPM (26 February 1914 – 26 January 2000) was Chief Inspector of Constabulary from January 1976 to July 1977.

He joined Birmingham City Police in 1935, rising to become Detective Chief Superintendent.  He was on the staff at the Police Staff College, Bramshill from 1963 to 1965 when he became Chief Constable of Liverpool City Police, which then expanded to include Bootle before restructuring to become Merseyside Police from 1974, of which he was Chief Constable until 1975. After his spell as Chief Inspector (1976–77) he went to Zimbabwe Rhodesia to assist with the implementation of the Lancaster House Agreement.

References

1914 births
2000 deaths
Chief Constables of Merseyside Police
English recipients of the Queen's Police Medal
Commanders of the Order of the British Empire
Knights Bachelor
Chief Inspectors of Constabulary (England and Wales)